Siim Valmar Kiisler (born 6 November 1965) is an Estonian politician, a member of the Parempoolsed, former member of Isamaa (Pro Patria and Res Publica Union).

Personal life 
In 1984, he finished his secondary education in Tallinn, and attended the Tallinn University of Technology. Seven years later, he received his degree in automated control systems.

He was president of the advisory council of the company Glacier Eesti AS between 1995 and  2003.

Married, he is the father of four boys (Taavi Kalle, Heiki Rein, Mati Kalev, Arti Tanel) and a girl (Mari Helmi). He speaks Estonian, English, Russian, and Finnish.

Political career 
He was elected to the municipal council of Tallinn in 1999. In the same year, Siim-Valmer Kiisler became the governor of the Kesklinn district in Tallinn for two years.

Reelected to the municipal council in 2002, he left in 2003, to seek election as an MP in the Riigikogu. He was elected until 2005, and again between 2006 and 2007.

He was first a member of the Res Publica party, which led the parliamentary group, and then joined the Union of Pro Patria and Res Publica (IRL).

He was re-elected to the Riigikogu on 4 March 2007, and named Vice-Minister of Economic Affairs and Communications, under Juhan Parts.

On 23 January 2008, Siim-Valmar Kiisler became Minister of Regional Affairs in the second cabinet of Andrus Ansip. He continued in the same capacity also in the third cabinet of Andrus Ansip that was in office until 26 March 2014.

After the 2015 election, Kiisler became deputy group chairman of his party in the Riigikogu in 2016. On 12 June 2017, he was appointed Minister of the Environment in Ratas' first cabinet as the successor to Marko Pomerants. In the 2019 parliamentary election, he only received 379 votes and did not win re-election. It was only through the death of his party colleague Mart Nutt that Kiisler returned to the government in June 2019. After the resignation of Ratas' second cabinet, had to leave the government, receiving nearly €26,000 in compensation.

In March 2022, the board of Isamaa expelled Kiisler from the party. He later joined the Parempoolsed party as its only member in Riigikogu.

See also 

 Politics of Estonia

References

External links 
  Biography on official site of the Estonian government
  Biography on the official site of the Estonian Ministry of the Interior

1965 births
Living people
Politicians from Tallinn
Res Publica Party politicians
Isamaa politicians
Government ministers of Estonia
Members of the Riigikogu, 2003–2007
Members of the Riigikogu, 2011–2015
Members of the Riigikogu, 2015–2019
Members of the Riigikogu, 2019–2023
Tallinn University of Technology alumni
21st-century Estonian politicians